The Madonna of Loreto or Pilgrim's Madonna is a painting (1604–1606) by the Italian Baroque master Caravaggio, located  in the Cavalletti Chapel of the church of Sant'Agostino, just northeast of the Piazza Navona in Rome. It depicts the barefoot Virgin holding her naked child in a doorway before two kneeling peasants on a pilgrimage.

In 1603 the heirs of marquis Ermete Cavalletti, who had died on 21 July 1602, commissioned a painting on the theme of the Madonna of Loreto to decorate a family chapel. As instructed by the marquis's will, the Cavaletti's purchased a chapel in the church of Sant'Agostino in Rome on 4 September 1603.

The painter Giovanni Baglione, a competitor who had successfully ensured Caravaggio was jailed during a libel trial, said that the unveiling of this painting "caused the common people to make a great cackle (schiamazzo) over it". The uproar was not surprising. The Virgin Mary, like her admiring pilgrims, is barefoot. The doorway or niche is not an exalted cumulus or bevy of putti, but a partly decrepit wall of flaking brick. Only a slim halo indicates her saintly status. While beautiful, the Virgin Mary could be any woman emerging from the shadows. Like many of Caravaggio's Roman paintings, such as the Conversion on the Way to Damascus or the Calling of St Matthew, the scene is a moment where an ordinary person encounters the divine, whose appearance is equally ordinary. The woman modelling Mary appears to be the same as that in Caravaggio's canvas in the Galleria Borghese: The Madonna and Child with St. Anne (Dei Palafrenieri) (1605).

It has been suggested that Caravaggio's composition is at least in part derived from a detail of a 1574 engraving, Adoration of the Magi, after Rosso Fiorentino, by Caravaggio's friend Cherubino Alberti (1553–1615).

See also
List of paintings by Caravaggio

References

External links

1600s paintings
Paintings by Caravaggio
Paintings of the Madonna and Child
Paintings in Rome